William Lawrence Chaplin (October 27, 1796 – April 28, 1871) was a prominent abolitionist in the years before the American Civil War. Known by the title of "General," he was an agent for the American Anti-Slavery Society and a general agent for the Underground Railroad. He was imprisoned for the attempted escape of two individuals, which required $25,000 to get out of jail and safely out of Maryland. He was an editor at two anti-slavery newspapers and he was a Harvard-educated lawyer for a couple of years. He and his wife operated the Glen Haven Water Cure spa in his later years.

Personal life

Chaplin was born on October 27, 1796, in Groton, Massachusetts. He was the son of  Daniel Chaplin, a Congregationalist minister and Susanna Prescott Chaplin. His maternal grandfather was Col. William Prescott, a commander at the Battle of Bunker Hill.

Beginning in 1804, he was educated at Andover Academy and he attended Harvard College in 1819, under the preceptorship of Mr. Butler. He attended Harvard for four years, but did not graduate. During his senior year, a group of 34 students, that did not include Chaplin, initiated a rebellion that caused them to be dismissed. Chaplin withdrew under his own counsel. He studied law under Judge Dana and he was admitted to the bar in June 1829.

He was married to Theodosia Gilbert at Glen Haven, New York, on August 12, 1851. Gilbert was the daughter of Betsey (née Green) and Deacon Elias Gilbert of Richmond, New York. They had two children: Harriet Lawrence was born on December 5, 1852, and died nine years later on December 21, 1861. Theodosia Gilbert, born on April 11, 1855, married Reverend Frederick John Clegg Walton. They attended the First Congregational Church of Pittsfield led by Rev. John Todd.

Career and activism
Chaplin advocated for temperance beginning in 1819. From 1829 until 1837, Chaplin was a practicing attorney in Groton and Easton, Massachusetts. He became an abolitionist by 1833 when he joined the newly formed American Anti-Slavery Society. He left his law practice to focus his efforts towards abolition of slavery. In 1837, he moved to Utica, New York, where he became a general agent of the New York Anti-Slavery Society. Among fellow abolitionists, he was known as "General Chaplin". He was the editor of the anti-slavery newspapers the American Citizen and the Albany Patriot, where he was also the Washington D.C. correspondent.

He joined a group headed by Gerrit Smith that formed the Liberty Party in 1840. They were radical political abolitionists. He was a Liberty Party candidate for lieutenant governor of New York in 1846 and for governor of New York in 1850.

Underground Railroad and arrest

In 1846, he moved to Washingtion, D.C., and filled the position left by Charles Turner Torrey when he died in prison that year; Chaplin became an agent for the Underground Railroad.  The Vigilance Committee provided funding for purchasing enslaved blacks and for the rescue of fugitive slaves. With Daniel Bell, a free black man, he organized and financed the attempted escape of 77 slaves from Washington, D.C. in the Pearl incident in 1848 and numerous other rescues of slaves. For instance, in November 1848 he negotiate the payment to free the Mary and Elizabeth Edmonson, who were fugitives during the Pearl incident.

Chaplin and other abolitionists yearned for more meaningful roles in the fight against slavery. In December 1848, Chaplin made a call for direct action: "to storm the castle of tyranny and rescue from its cruel grasp its bruised and peeled victims". In 1849 or 1850, Chaplin helped Anna Maria Weems's sister Mary Jane (Stella) Weems and the Young family (Mary Jane's aunt, uncle and cousins) successfully escape slavery.

In August 1850, Chaplin was arrested for aiding in the escape of two slaves, Allen and Garland H. White, who were owned by then-congressmen Alexander Hamilton Stephens and Robert Toombs of Georgia, respectively. They left Washington D.C. and were held at the home of General Walter Jones for "some time". A $500 reward was set for both slaves and John H. Goddard, the pro-slavery captain of the night guard and police magistrate, was hired to search for them. Based upon a tip, Goddard and his posse waited for the escapees, who had been picked up by a carriage and taken to the Maryland-Pennsylvania border. The carriage was ambushed on the Washington-Brookeville Pike (now Georgia Avenue at what is now Jesup Blair Park) in Silver Spring, Maryland. Chaplin was hit with a club and shots were fired into the carriage, wounding Allen and Garland. Allen was captured and Garland escaped but surrendered after a few days.

Chaplin was held in jail starting on April 8, 1850, but his crime was in August with six weeks in District of Columbia and then transferred to the jail in Rockville, Maryland for another 13 weeks. Monies to pay for his bail and defense were acquired through donations to the Chaplin Fund Committee. Chaplin was bailed out for $19,000 and for a total of $25,000 to ensure that he was not lynched while leaving the state. The bail and defense payments were paid by prominent abolitionist Gerrit Smith and others. The money was forfeited as Chaplin skipped bail and returned to New York. Some people were left penniless after making the donations. Chaplin performed anti-slavery lectures to attain money to recoup donations to his bail fund. The events were recorded in a pamphlet entitled The Case of William L. Chaplin; being an Appeal to all Respecters of Law and Justice against the cruel and oppressive treatment to which, under color of legal proceedings, he has been subjected, in the District of Columbia and the State of Maryland.

Chaplin's minister, Rev. John Todd, defended him in the October 30, 1850, issue of The New York Evangelist. Todd said that Chaplin had "one of the noblest, most self-sacrificing, unselfish hearts that ever beat in human bosom." A historical marker at the Howard County Courthouse in Ellicott City, Maryland, states that it

Anticipating the Fugitive Slave Act of 1850, the Cazenovia convention was held on August 21 and 22 in 1850 in Cazenovia, New York. It was organized by Charles Bennett Ray and Gerrit Smith of the New York State Vigilance Association and attended by Frederick Douglass and Mary and Elizabeth Edmonson, who were fugitives during the Pearl incident and subsequently ran away. There were some 30 fugitive slaves that attended the convention. Chaplin was held in a jail, so his fiancé, Theodosia Gilbert, attended in his stead.

James C. Jackson, Joseph C. Hathaway, and Chaplin split from other abolitionists and joined the Free Democratic party.

Post-arrest years

In 1851, William L. Chaplin joined his wife and James C. Jackson in operating the Glen Haven Water Cure spa, where Chaplin and Theodosia Gilbert were married on August 12, 1851. Theodosia died on April 11, 1855, after the birth of her second child. He died at his home on April 28, 1871, in Cortland County, New York. Harriet, Theodosia, and William were buried at the Cortland Rural Cemetery.

Notes

References

Further reading

External links
 

1796 births
1871 deaths
People from Groton, Massachusetts
American abolitionists
New York (state) Libertyites